These are the official results of the Men's Discus Throw event at the 1990 European Championships in Split, Yugoslavia , held at Stadion Poljud on 31 August and 1 September 1990. There were a total number of 23 participating athletes.

Medalists

Qualification

Final

Participation
According to an unofficial count, 23 athletes from 15 countries participated in the event.

 (2)
 (2)
 (2)
 (2)
 (1)
 (1)
 (2)
 (1)
 (1)
 (1)
 (2)
 (1)
 (1)
 (3)
 (1)

See also
 1988 Men's Olympic Discus Throw (Seoul)
 1991 Men's World Championships Discus Throw (Tokyo)
 1992 Men's Olympic Discus Throw (Barcelona)

References

 Results

Discus throw
Discus throw at the European Athletics Championships